The Țarcu Mountains are a mountain range in the southwestern Romania, at the western edge of the Southern Carpathians. They are located between the Bistra Valley (to the south), Timiș River (to the east), Godeanu Mountains (to the northwest) and Râul Mare Valley (to the west), the last one being a natural barrier between them and the Retezat Mountains.
The Țarcu Mountains have been declared Natura 2000 protected area since 2007 because they shelter valuable biodiversity and spectacular nature.
Together with the Retezat Mountains, the Godeanu Mountains and Cernei Mountains they form the last European Intact Forest Landscape, if we do not take boreal forests (from Scandinavia and Russia) into account.

Geology
Most rocks in the range are crystalline, with few areas with sedimentary rocks. As such, the mountains are massifs, cut by narrow valleys. Limestone is found only in a few places. Erosion has formed several very prominent platforms, such as the Borăscu platform. Glaciers were present during the ice ages, leaving glacial calderas and small glacial lakes, such as the Bistra Lake.

Climate
Because of the western climatic influences, the amount of rainfall in the Țarcu Mountains is quite large. Snow may fall at altitudes above 1500 metres at any time in the year, while the snow pack usually lasts from October or November until June or even July in the glacial calderas of the highest peaks.

Important peaks
 Vârful Țarcu, 2190 metres, has a weather station on its top.
 Vârful Pietrii, 2192 metres, dominating the Bistra Lake.
 Vârful Căleanu, 2190 metres.
 Muntele Mic, 1802 metres, has a ski resort.
 Măgura Marga, 1503 metres, dominating the Marga village.
 Vârful Cuntu, 1441 metres, has a weather station nearby.

External links
 Intact Forest Landscapes
 Alpinet
 Tarcu Mountains Natura 2000 Site, in Romanian
 Carpathians Mountains, in Romanian

Mountain ranges of Romania
Mountain ranges of the Southern Carpathians
Geography of Caraș-Severin County
Banat